BRL-50481 is a drug developed by GlaxoSmithKline which is the first compound that acts as a phosphodiesterase inhibitor selective for the PDE7 family. PDE7 activity is encoded by two genes, PDE7A and PDE7B. BRL-50481 actually shows about an 80-fold preference for the PDE7A subtype, for which it was developed, over PDE7B. BRL-50481 has been shown to increase mineralisation activity in osteoblasts, suggesting a potential role for PDE7 inhibitors in the treatment of osteoporosis.

References 

Phosphodiesterase inhibitors
Sulfonamides
Nitrobenzenes
Experimental drugs